Sadr al-Din Sadr (1882 – 26 November 1953) was the father of Moussa as-Sadr (disappeared in Libya in 1978) and Rabab al-Sadr, and the grandson of the Grand Ayatollah Sadr-eddine bin Saleh after whom the Sadr family of well-known scholars of Twelver Shi'a Islam has been named.

He is the second son of Sayyed Grand Ayatollah Ismail as-Sadr (d.1920). He was born in what is today Iraq to Lebanese parents and led a progressive religious group there. He then migrated to Khorasan where he married the daughter of Grand Ayatollah Hussein al-Qummi (:wikidata:Q20557209). Then he left to the Shia center of learning (hawzayi'ilmī) in Qom, Iran, where he became a renowned Grand Ayatollah. He died on 26 November 1953 in Iran.

See also

Ismail al-Sadr
Haydar al-Sadr
Sayyid Muhammad Ali Hosseini Shahrestani
Musa al-Sadr
Muhammad Baqir al-Sadr
Muhammad Sadiq al-Sadr
Muhammad Muhammad Sadiq al-Sadr
List of Shi'a Muslim scholars of Islam
List of Ayatollahs

References

 Arabic biography of Imam Moussa as-Sadr

1882 births
1953 deaths
Ayatollahs
Iraqi Shia clerics
Iraqi ayatollahs
Iraqi Shia Muslims
Lebanese emigrants to Iran
Al-Moussawi family
Pupils of Muhammad Kadhim Khorasani
Burials at Fatima Masumeh Shrine